List of past ministers of the Federal Republic of Germany (1945–present)

Konrad Adenauer, CDU (Chancellor)
Hans Apel, SPD (1974–1978 Finance, 1978–1982 Defense)
Walter Arendt, SPD
Egon Bahr, SPD
Rainer Barzel, CDU (1962–1963 and 1982–1983 Inner-German affairs)
Norbert Blüm, CDU (1982–1998 Labour)
Kurt Bodewig, SPD (2000–2002 Transportation)
Wolfgang Bötsch, CSU
Jochen Borchert, CDU (1993–1998 Agriculture)
Willy Brandt, SPD (1966–1969 Foreign affairs, 1969–1974 Chancellor)
Rainer Brüderle, FDP (2008–2011 Economy)
Andreas von Bülow, SPD
Herta Däubler-Gmelin, SPD (1998–2002 Justice)
Horst Ehmke, SPD
Björn Engholm, SPD
Erhard Eppler, SPD
Ludwig Erhard, CDU (Economy, 1963–1966 Chancellor)
Josef Ertl, FDP (Agriculture 1969–1982;1982–1983)
Andrea Fischer, Greens (1998–2001 Health)
Egon Franke, SPD
Hans Friedrichs, FDP (Economy)
Anke Fuchs, SPD (Youth, family, and health)
Hans-Dietrich Genscher, FDP (1969–1974 Interior, 1974–1992 Foreign affairs)
Heiner Geißler, CDU (1982–1985 Youth, family and health)
Kurt Gscheidle, SPD (Transportation, Postal services)
Johann Baptist Gradl, CDU (1965–1966)
Dieter Haack, SPD (Construction and housing)
Volker Hauff, SPD (Transportation)
Helmut Haussmann, FDP (1988–1991 Economy)
Gustav Heinemann, 1945–1952 CDU; after 1957 SPD (1949–1950 Interior, 1966–1969 Justice, 1969–1974 Bundespräsident)
Hermann Höcherl, CSU (Interior, later Agriculture)
Gerhard Jahn, SPD (1969–1974 Justice)
Manfred Kanther, CDU (1993–1998 Interior)
Ignaz Kiechle, CSU (1983–1993 Agriculture)
Kurt Georg Kiesinger, CDU (1966–1969 Chancellor)
Klaus Kinkel, FDP(1991–1992 Justice, 1992–1998 Foreign affairs)
Helmut Kohl, CDU (1982–1998 Chancellor)
Günther Krause, CDU
Oskar Lafontaine, SPD (1998–1999 Finance)
Manfred Lahnstein, SPD (Finance)
Otto Graf Lambsdorff, FDP (1977–1984 Economy)
Lauritz Lauritzen, SPD (Transportation)
Georg Leber, SPD (1966–1974 Transportation and additionally from 1969 to 1974 Postal Services, 1974–1978 Defense)
Sabine Leutheusser-Schnarrenberger, FDP
Heinrich Lübke, CDU (1953-59 Food and Agriculture, 1959–1969 Bundespräsident)
Werner Maihofer, FDP
Lothar de Maizière, CDU
Hans Matthöfer, SPD (Finance)
Angela Merkel, CDU (1991–1994 Women and Youth; 1994–1998 Environment, Conservation and Nuclear Safety)
Jürgen Möllemann, FDP (1987–1991 education and science, 1991–1993 Economy)
Claudia Nolte, CDU
Rainer Ortleb, FDP
Günter Rexrodt, FDP
Heinz Riesenhuber, CDU
Hannelore Rönsch, CDU
Volker Rühe, CDU (Defense)
Jürgen Rüttgers, CDU(1994–1998 education, science, research and technology)
Fritz Schäffer, CSU (Finance, later Justice)
Wolfgang Schäuble, CDU (1984–1989 Kanzleramt (Chief of Staff); 1989–1991 Interior)
Rudolf Scharping, SPD (1998–2002 Defense)
Walter Scheel, FDP
Karl Schiller, SPD (1966–1972 Economy and additionally 1972–1972 Finance)
Marie Schlei, SPD (Economic cooperation)
Helmut Schmidt, SPD (1969–1972 Defense; 1972–1974 Finance; 1974–1982 Chancellor; September 1982 additionally Foreign Affairs)
Jürgen Schmude, SPD (1981–1982 Justice; September 1982 additionally Interior)
Rupert Scholz, CDU (1988–1989 Defense)
Gerhard Schröder, CDU (1953–1961 Interior; 1961–1966 Foreign Affairs; 1966–1969 Defense)
Gerhard Schröder, SPD (1998–2005 Chancellor)
Irmgard Schwaetzer, FDP (1991–1994 Infrastructure and Building)
Christian Schwarz-Schilling, CDU
Horst Seehofer, CSU
Rudolf Seiters, CDU (Interior)
Carl-Dieter Spranger, CDU
Gerhard Stoltenberg, CDU (1982–1989 Finance, 1989–1992 Defense)
Franz Josef Strauß, CSU (1955–1956 Nuclear Energy; 1956–1962 Defense; 1966–1969 Finance)
Rita Süssmuth, CDU
Klaus Töpfer, CDU
Hans-Jochen Vogel, SPD
Theodor Waigel, CSU (Finance)
Herbert Wehner, SPD (1966–1969 Minister for Inner-German affairs)
Hans-Jürgen Wischnewski, SPD
Matthias Wissmann, CDU
Manfred Wörner, CDU (1982–1988 Defense)

See also
History of Germany
Politics of Germany
Chancellor of Germany (Federal Republic)
President of Germany
Lists of incumbents

!
Lists of political office-holders in Germany